Ad gentes (To the Nations) is the Second Vatican Council's decree on missionary activity.

The document establishes evangelization as one of the fundamental missions of the Catholic Church and reaffirms the tie between evangelization and charity for the poor. Ad gentes also calls for the formation of strong Christian communities as well as strong relations with other Christians. Finally, it lays out guidelines for the training and actions of the missionaries.

See also
Catholic charities
Evangelii gaudium
Lumen gentium
Redemptoris missio

References

Further reading 

 Teaching the Spirit of Mission Ad Gentes: Continuing Pentecost Today: A Statement of the United States Conference of Catholic Bishops, 2005

External links
 Ad gentes: English translation at the Vatican website

Catholic missions
Decrees
Documents of the Second Vatican Council
Latin texts
1965 documents
1965 in Christianity